Syr Hywel y Fwyall (fl. 1356 – died c. 1381), or 'Hywel of the Battleaxe', was a Welsh knight and hero. He is also referred to as Sir Hywel ap Gruffydd.

According to Philip Yorke's The Royal Tribes of Wales, his father was Gruffydd ab Howel ab Meredydd ab Einion ab Gwganen. Sir John Wynne, however, says that he was the son of Einion ab Gruffydd Both the accounts agree that he was descended from Collwyn ab Tangno, "lord of Eifionydd, Ardudwy, and part of Llŷn". Hywel was one of the Welshmen who fought at the Battle of Poitiers in 1356, and Welsh tradition made him out to be the actual captor of John II of France, "cutting off his horse's head at one blow" The Dictionary of Welsh Biography gives his father as being "Gruffydd ap Hywel (from Collwyn), of Bron-y-Foel in the township of Ystumllyn and the parish of Ynyscynhaiarn, Eifionydd, by Angharad, daughter of Tegwared y Bais" and his grandmother as being the granddaughter of Ednyfed Fychan.

Hywel seems to have fought well, for he was knighted by Edward the Black Prince, and was afterwards (1359) made Constable of Criccieth Castle, as well as being given the rent of Dee Mills at Chester, "besides other great things in North Wales". As a memorial of his services a mess of meat was ordered to be served before his axe in perpetuity, the food being afterwards given to the poor "for his soul's health". This ceremony is said to have been observed until the beginning of Elizabeth I's time, eight yeoman attendants at 8d. a day having charge of the meat. Hywel was also "raglot" or bailiff of Aberglaslyn, and died "between Michaelmas 2 and the same time 6 Rich. II", leaving two sons, Meredydd, who lived in Eifionydd; and Dafydd, who lived at Henblas, near Llanrwst.

The bard Iolo Goch describes his family in a poem: his wife was "Tanglwst, daughter of one Dafydd Fychan ap Hywel; there was one son, Gruffydd, who left no direct heirs". But several of the Eifionydd families have descended from his elder brother, Einion.

References

Source

Notes

14th-century soldiers
14th-century Welsh people
Welsh knights